David Franciscus Johan Bergman (born 16 August 1981 in Haarlem, the Netherlands) is a Dutch baseball player who currently plays for Kinheim of the Honkbal Hoofdklasse baseball league.

Career 
Bergman started his career at Haarlem based Nicols and later at DSS. The longest period of his career he played for Pioniers from Hoofddorp. He was first selected for the Netherlands' youth squad in 1997 for which he played three seasons. In these years he became European Champion for three consecutive years. In 1999 he won de Roel de Mon Award, a trophy for the best junior pitcher in de Honkbal Hoofdklasse. A year later he won the 2000 Triple Crown Tournament in Belgium with the Dutch national B-team.

Bergman was first selected for the Netherlands national baseball team in 2003. There he teamed up with Pioniers team mates Robin van Doornspeek and Roger Kops, who are also both pitchers. Bergman took part in the 2003 World Port Tournament, the European Baseball Championships and the 2004 Summer Olympics qualification tournament. With Pioniers he won the 2003 European Cup Winners' Cup and the 2004 European Super Cup. After missing out on the Summer Olympics itself he rejoined the national squad in 2005 for the European Championships in the Czech Republic, where they won the title.

After the European title win Bergman and the Dutch team wrote history when they reached the semi finals for the 2005 World Championships held in their own country. The Dutch eventually finished in fourth position. Bergman won one of his two games and finished with an average of 1.00. In March 2006 he was part of the squad that took part in the 2006 World Baseball Classic in Puerto Rico. The Netherlands won one of their three matches in the tournament. Bergman played 1 inning against Puerto Rico in which he was hit four times and gave one RBI away. Later in that year he took part in the Dutch squad that played at the European Baseball Classic, the Haarlemse Honkbalweek and the 2006 Intercontintental Cup, which was won by the Dutch.

2006 was one of Bergman's best years ever. In his first Kinheim season he won twelve matches and only lost one. Kinheim became Honkbal Hoofdklasse regular league champions and in the Holland Series they won the national title when they defeated Pioniers.

2009 In March 2009 he was part of the squad that took part in the 2009 World Baseball Classic in Puerto Rico and United States.

2011 IBAF World Champion

2012 Kinheim finished 4th in the Honkbal Hoofdklasse regular season and made it to the Holland Series where they won the national title when they defeated DOOR Neptunus with a 4-0 sweep. David Bergman was named Holland Series MVP.

External links
Bergman at Honkbalsite.com 

Dutch baseball players
Sportspeople from Haarlem
2006 World Baseball Classic players
2009 World Baseball Classic players
Olympic baseball players of the Netherlands
Baseball players at the 2008 Summer Olympics
2013 World Baseball Classic players
1981 births
Living people